is a Japanese game director, writer and part of Spike Chunsoft's affiliation. Since 1995, he contributes to the company with the Mystery Dungeon franchise as the main writer for the Shiren the Wanderer, and Pokémon Mystery Dungeon series. Prior to his affiliation to the company in 1992, he has also contributed in Tecmo's Tecmo Bowl series of sport games.

Career
His hobby is soccer, and the Captain Tsubasa series was his initial source of inspiration.

Tecmo
Tomie joined Tecmo, now known as Koei Tecmo, after graduating from university. During that time, he was engaged in soccer-themed games, such as Tecmo Bowl in 1987 and Captain Tsubasa II in 1990. For Tecmo Super Bowl, published in 1991, though Japan had limited NFL coverage overall in the late 1980s, him and programmer Akihiko Shimoji were recording games from NHK satellite TVs to reproduce it in-game. Tomie's passion on sports has also helped the team to work on Tecmo Super Bowl.

Chunsoft
Later in 1992, Tomie was transferred to Chunsoft and consistently worked on the scenario of the Shiren the Wanderer series since its first title in 1995. The reason of working as a writer comes from the company's Sound Novel series, as he was not inspired of Otogiriso, but thought it was an innovative game, in addition to the lack of writers in the company. His hobby for sport games is particularly noticeable in Shiren the Wanderer 2 and Shiren Monsters: Netsal, where he oversaw both games as the director.

The scenarios present throughout the Mystery Dungeon series were written so they would not interfere too much into the franchise's roguelike genre. The scenario for the Shiren the Wanderer series is smaller but also intriguing for each title as they are mixed with its difficulty. Initially, he has suggested to put the setting of the series in feudal Japan, compared to the earlier Mystery Dungeon title, Torneko's Great Adventure: Mystery Dungeon. In the Pokémon Mystery Dungeon series, the scenario has more presence in the gameplay than the former series and its appeal comes from "their directions and sounds" rather than the scenario alone. Furthermore, the series does not have a linear timeline between the mainline Pokémon franchise and this series so newcomers would be introduced easily into the series and the genre. In an interview held in 2022, Tomie claimed he was not aware of the western fanbase but was able to receive messages from Japanese fans of the series via letters, with some of them claiming Pokémon Mystery Dungeon: Explorers of Time and Explorers of Darkness, and its sister game Pokémon Mystery Dungeon: Explorers of Sky, his "magnum opus".

In 2012, during the first Nico Nico Game Master event, him and Kaoru Hasegawa appeared in the finale of a real-time attack of the first Shiren the Wanderer game. Even if both series have not received a brand new title since 2010 and 2015 respectively, Tomie left a secret message in the 2020 port of Shiren the Wanderer: The Tower of Fortune and the Dice of Fate, indicating he would still be able to work on the next games if there are enough voices from the fans to green-lit a new Mystery Dungeon game in the company.

Works

References

External links
 Shin-ichiro Tomie profile at MobyGames

Living people
1961 births
Japanese writers
Japanese video game designers